Free Press was an American independent book publisher that later became an imprint of Simon & Schuster. It was one of the best-known publishers specializing in serious nonfiction, including path-breaking sociology books of the 1950s, 1960s and 1970s. After a period under new ownership in the 1980s of publishing neoconservative books, it was purchased by Simon & Schuster in 1994. By 2012, the imprint ceased to exist as a distinct entity; however, some books were still being published using the Free Press imprint.

History
Free Press was founded by Jeremiah Kaplan (1926–1993) and Charles Liebman in 1947 and concentrated on religion and social science. They chose the name Free Press because they wanted to print books devoted to civil liberties. It was launched with three classic titles: Division of Labor by Emile Durkheim, The Theory of Economic and Social Organization by Max Weber and The Scientific Outlook by Bertrand Russell. It was headquartered in Glencoe, Illinois, where it was known as The Free Press of Glencoe.

In 1960, Kaplan was recruited by Macmillan to provide new editorial leadership and he agreed to move to New York if Macmillan Publishing Company would buy Free Press, and thus Free Press was sold in 1960 for $1.3 million ($500,000 going to Kaplan and $800,000 going to Liebman).

In 1994, Simon & Schuster acquired Macmillan and Free Press. In 2012, it was announced that Free Press would cease to exist as a distinct entity and would be merged into Simon & Schuster, the company's flagship imprint. "We plan to continue publishing thought leaders and other important cultural voices under the Free Press imprimatur, while also introducing many other Free Press authors, such as novelists and historians and business writers, to the flagship Simon & Schuster imprint."

During the 1960s and 1970s Free Press was under the direction of a variety of publishers including George McCune (who later co-founded SAGE Publishing with his wife Sara), Valery Webb, Ed Barry and Robert Wallace. Under Barry's leadership in 1974, Ernest Becker's The Denial of Death won the Pulitzer Prize. In 1983, Erwin Glikes, a well-known political neoconservative, took over leadership. This began an era of controversial conservative books including The Tempting of America by Robert Bork, and The Closing of the American Mind by Allan Bloom. Glikes was succeeded by Adam Bellow, who also published neoconservative books including Illiberal Education by Dinesh D'Souza, The Real Anita Hill by David Brock, and The Bell Curve by Charles Murray and Richard Herrnstein. In 1994, Simon & Schuster acquired Macmillan and Free Press was led by publishers Michael Jacobs, Paula Barker Duffy, and William Shinker for short stints.

Free Press was led by publisher Martha Levin from 2001 until 2012, when it ceased to exist as a distinct entity and merged into Simon & Schuster's flagship imprint. In 2003, two of the five finalists for the 2003 National Book Award in the non-fiction category were Free Press titles, including the winner, Waiting for Snow in Havana by Carlos Eire. In 2008, Free Press published The White Tiger, Indian author Aravind Adiga's debut novel, which won the Man Booker Prize.

Notable books

 Carl Menger (1950). Principles of Economics. Glencoe, IL: Free Press
 Talcott Parsons (1951). The Social System. Glencoe, IL: Free Press
 Elihu Katz and Paul Lazarsfeld (1955). Personal Influence. Glencoe, IL: Free Press
 Robert K. Merton (1957). Social Theory and Social Structure. Glencoe, IL: Free Press
 Robert E. Lane (1959). Political Life: Why People Get Involved in Politics. Glencoe, IL: Free Press
 James S. Coleman (1961). The Adolescent Society. Glencoe, IL: Free Press
 Herbert Gans (1962). The Urban Villagers. Glencoe, IL: Free Press
 Everett Rogers (1962). Diffusion of Innovations. Glencoe, IL: Free Press
 Erving Goffman (1963). Behavior in Public Places. Glencoe, IL: Free Press
 Stanley Lieberson (1963). Ethnic Patterns in American Cities. Glencoe, IL: Free Press
 Howard S. Becker (1963). Outsiders: Studies in the Sociology of Deviance. New York: Free Press.
 Ernest Becker (1973). The Denial of Death. New York: Free Press.
 Claude Fischer, et al., (1977). Networks and Places. New York: Free Press. 
 Peter Blau and Otis Dudley Duncan. (1978). The American Occupational Structure. New York: Free Press. 
 Everett Rogers and D. Lawrence Kincaid. (1981). Communication Networks. New York: Free Press.

References

External links
 Free Press homepage at Simon & Schuster 
 Divisions and Imprints at Simon & Schuster

 
Defunct book publishing companies of the United States
Simon & Schuster
Book publishing company imprints
Book publishing companies based in New York (state)
Publishing companies based in New York City
American companies established in 1947
Publishing companies established in 1947
Mass media companies disestablished in 2012
1947 establishments in New York (state)
2012 disestablishments in New York (state)
Defunct companies based in New York City